Hosensack (HOE-zen-sak) is an unincorporated community in Lower Milford Township in Lehigh County, Pennsylvania. It is part of the Lehigh Valley, which has a population of 861,899 and was the 68th most populous metropolitan area in the U.S. as of the 2020 census. 

The Hosensack Creek flows southwestward through the village into the Perkiomen Creek in Palm. Zionsville is two miles to the north and Hosensack residents use its zip code of 18092, except for a very small number on Mill Hill who use the East Greenville zip code of 18041. It is in the Pennsburg telephone exchange and uses area code 215.

History
During the mid-1730s, the Kings Highway was surveyed and settlement began in the Hosensack Valley. A group of German travelers compelled to spend a night in the valley remarked "es war so dunkel wie in einem Hosensack" (it was as dark as in a pants pocket.) The original name of the village was Buckhorn and it was founded in 1759. 

1759 establishments in Pennsylvania
Unincorporated communities in Lehigh County, Pennsylvania
Unincorporated communities in Pennsylvania